Redovino Rizzardo (March 12, 1939 – November 6, 2016) was a Roman Catholic bishop.

Ordained to the priesthood in 1967, Rizzardo served as coadjutor bishop of the Roman Catholic Diocese of Dourados, Brazil, in 2001 and then served as diocesan bishop from 2001 until 2015.

He died on November 6, 2016, at the age of 77 from prostate cancer.

References

External links

1939 births
2016 deaths
21st-century Roman Catholic bishops in Brazil
Deaths from prostate cancer
Roman Catholic bishops of Dourados